Teatro Sant' Apollinare was an Italian public opera house established in 1651 in Venice in what is today Petriana Court. The Sant 'Apollinare was established in a residential building and equipped with advanced stage machinery intended to allow for spectacular stage shows. It was managed in 1651 by impessario and librettist Giovanni Faustini, who died during the first run of his opera La Calisto there. After his death, his brother Marco Faustini took over management of the theater. It was dismantled in 1661 and the rooms returned to residential use.

References
JA Glover: The Theatre Sant'Apollinare and the Development of Seventeenth-Century Venetian Opera (University of Oxford, 1975)
F. Mancini, MT Muraro, E. Povoledo: The theaters in the Veneto - Venice theater ephemera and noble entrepreneurs (Venice, 1995)

Opera houses in Italy
1651 establishments in Italy
1661 disestablishments
Theatres in Venice
Theatres completed in 1651
Music venues completed in 1651
Demolished buildings and structures in Italy
Buildings and structures demolished in the 17th century